Andrew David Gilroy Bevan (10 April 1928 – 12 October 1996) was a British Conservative politician.

He was Member of Parliament for Birmingham Yardley from 1979, until he lost the seat by 162 votes to future Labour minister Estelle Morris in 1992.

He was Chairman of the Parliamentary All-Party Tourism Committee and Chairman of the Conservative Parliamentary Backbench Tourism Committee for several successive parliaments until he lost his seat in 1992, and did much to promote the British tourism industry.

Sources
The Times Guide to the House of Commons, 1992

External links 

1928 births
1996 deaths
Conservative Party (UK) MPs for English constituencies
UK MPs 1979–1983
UK MPs 1983–1987
UK MPs 1987–1992